James Bergin (born 26 November 1998) is an Irish hurler who plays for Kilkenny Intermediate Championship club Conahy Shamrocks and at inter-county level with the Kilkenny senior hurling team. He usually lines out as a right corner-forward.

Career

Bergin first came to prominence with the Conahy Shamrocks club when he captained the team to the All-Ireland Junior Club Championship title in 2020. He first appeared at inter-county level as a member of the Kilkenny under-20 team that claimed the Leinster Under-20 Championship title in 2019. Bergin made his senior debut during the 2021 National League.

Career statistics

Honours

Conahy Shamrocks
All-Ireland Junior Club Hurling Championship: 2020 (c)
Leinster Junior Club Hurling Championship: 2020 (c)
Kilkenny Junior Hurling Championship: 2020 (c)

Kilkenny
Leinster Under-20 Hurling Championship: 2019

References

1998 births
Living people
Conahy Shamrocks hurlers
Kilkenny inter-county hurlers